Queensland Coach Company was an Australian bus bodybuilder in Eagle Farm, Brisbane.

History
Queensland Coach Company was established in February 1999 by Greyhound Pioneer Australia to body 135 Scania coaches over five years, including 94 for its interstate coach operation. Originally an alliance was formed with bodybuilder Alan B Denning with it proposed the Galaxy body design be used. But following the collapse of the Clifford Corporation, the rights to the Austral Pacific Majestic body were purchased.

In July 2000 Queensland Coach Company ceased trading and was put into liquidation. The rights to the Majestic body were sold to Mills-Tui.

While many of the coaches bodied were Scania K113TRB and K124EBs for Greyhound Pioneer Australia, it also bodied buses and coaches for external clients. A total of 46 bodies were completed.

References

External links
Bus Australia gallery

[

Bus manufacturers of Australia
Australian companies established in 1999
Australian companies disestablished in 2000
Vehicle manufacturing companies established in 1999